Second Helping is the second studio album by Lynyrd Skynyrd, released on April 15, 1974. It features the band's biggest hit single, "Sweet Home Alabama," an answer song to Neil Young's "Alabama" and "Southern Man", which reached #8 on the Billboard Hot 100 chart in August 1974, as well as drummer Bob Burns' final recordings.

Second Helping reached #12 on the Billboard album charts. The RIAA certified it Gold on September 20, 1974, and Double Platinum on July 21, 1987.

Background

After the success of their debut album, (Pronounced 'Lĕh-'nérd 'Skin-'nérd), Lynyrd Skynyrd's fan base continued to grow rapidly throughout 1973, largely due to their opening slot on the Who's Quadrophenia tour in the United States. Second Helping features King, Collins and Rossington all collaborating with Ronnie Van Zant on the songwriting, and cemented the band's breakthrough.

Critical reception 

Reviewing for Rolling Stone in 1974, Gordon Fletcher said Lynyrd Skynyrd performs a consistent style of Southern music-influenced blues rock similar to the Allman Brothers Band but lacks that group's "sophistication and professionalism. If a song doesn’t feel right to the Brothers, they work on it until it does; if it isn’t right to Lynyrd Skynyrd, they are more likely to crank up their amps and blast their way through the bottleneck." Fletcher concluded that Second Helping is distinct from (Pronounced 'Lĕh-'nérd 'Skin-'nérd) "only by a certain mellowing out that indicates they may eventually acquire a level of savoirfaire to realize their many capabilities".
Robert Christgau was also lukewarm in Creem, saying Lynyrd Skynyrd is "still a substantial, tasteful band, but I have a hunch they blew their best stuff on the first platter."

Christgau warmed to the album later, however, reappraising it in Christgau's Record Guide: Rock Albums of the Seventies (1981); he observed "infectious putdowns of rock businessmen, rock journalists, and heroin", and "great formula" in general: "When it rocks, three guitarists and a keyboard player pile elementary riffs and feedback noises into dense combinations broken by preplanned solos, while at quieter moments the spare vocabulary of the best Southern folk music is evoked or just plain duplicated." In a retrospective review for AllMusic, Stephen Thomas Erlewine said Second Helping "replicated all the strengths" of the first album's expert Southern rock "but was a little tighter and a little more professional." Houston Press named it in #2 on its list "Five Essential Boogie-Rock Albums."

Track listing

 Sides one and two were combined as tracks 1–8 on CD reissues.

Track 9 previously released as the band's lead single in April 1974
Track 10 is previously unreleased
Track 11 previously released on Legend

Personnel 

Lynyrd Skynyrd
 Ronnie Van Zant – lead vocals
 Gary Rossington – guitar
 Allen Collins – guitar
 Ed King – guitar, backing vocals, bass on "I Need You" and "Don't Ask Me No Questions"
 Leon Wilkeson – bass (all tracks except "I Need You" and "Don't Ask Me No Questions"), backing vocals
 Bob Burns – drums, except "I Need You"
 Billy Powell – keyboards

Additional personnel
 Mike Porter – drums on "I Need You"
 Merry Clayton, Clydie King, Sherlie Matthews – background vocals on "Sweet Home Alabama"
 Bobby Keys, Trevor Lawrence and Steve Madaio – horns on "Don't Ask Me No Questions" and "Call Me the Breeze"
 Al Kooper – backing vocals, piano on "Don't Ask Me No Questions" and "The Ballad of Curtis Loew"

Charts

Certifications

References

External links 
 

Lynyrd Skynyrd albums
1974 albums
MCA Records albums
Albums produced by Al Kooper
Boogie rock albums